This is a list of films produced by the Ollywood film industry based in Bhubaneshwar and Cuttack in 1950:

A-Z

References

1950
Ollywood
Films, Ollywood
1950s in Orissa